The Urban Music Awards Australia and New Zealand were established in 2006 as a means of celebrating hip hop, soul and R&B acts throughout the two countries. Two awards ceremonies were held, in 2006 and 2007.

The first show aired on Friday 21 July 2006 at Sydney's Homebush State Sports Centre and was presented by Jazzy Jeff and Kurtis Blow. The 2007 awards were held on Tuesday 14 August at Sydney's Milsons Point Luna Park.

Winners were decided by public votes from nominees selected by a panel of music industry figures (with the exception of the "Best DJ" and "Best Club Night" awards, which are purely public voted; and the "Best Producer" and "Urban Hero" awards, which were industry-voted only).

Locations
2006 - Sydney's Homebush State Sports Centre
2007 - Sydney's Milsons Point Luna Park

Award winners

2006

Best Hip Hop Single: Scribe and P-Money - Stop the Music
Best R&B Single: Savage - Moonshine
Best Hip Hop Album: Savage - Moonshine
Best R&B Album: Jade MacRae - Jade MacRae
Best Male Artist: Guy Sebastian
Best Female Artist: Jade McRae
Best R&B Group: Random
Best R&B Single: Savage - Moonshine
Best Hip Hop Group: Hilltop Hoods
Best New Talent: FiggKidd
Best DJ (Australia): Nino Brown
Best DJ (New Zealand): P-Money
Best Club Night (Australia): Candy Shop
Best Club Night (New Zealand): RnB Superclub
Best Video Clip: Guy Sebastian - Oh Oh
Best Radio Show: K Sera and the Dirty Dozen
Urban Hero Award: Brotha D - Dawn Raid
Best International Act: Kanye West

2007
Best Hip Hop Single: Phrase - Hold On
Best R&B Single: Israel - My Girl
Best Hip Hop Album: Hilltop Hoods - The Hard Road
Best R&B Album: Guy Sebastian - Closer to the Sun
Best Male Artist: Tyree
Best Female Artist: Jade MacRae
Best New Talent: Justice & Kaos
Best Hip Hop Group: Hilltop Hoods
Best R&B Group: Kid Confucius
Best DJ (Australia): Nino Brown
Best DJ (New Zealand): DJ Sir-Vere
Best Club Night (Australia): Redroom
Best Club Night (New Zealand): RnB Superclub
Best Radio Show: Stolen Records
Best Video Clip: Phrase - Hold On
Best Producer: P-Money
Best Unsigned Artist: Jess Harlen
Urban Hero Award: Doug Williams

References

External links
Urban Music Awards Official Website

Australian music awards
Awards disestablished in 2008